English electronic music band Hot Chip have released eight studio albums, eight extended plays, two mix albums, 29 singles, five promotional singles and 24 music videos.

Albums

Studio albums

Compilation albums

Mix albums

Extended plays

Singles

As lead artist

Promotional singles

Guest appearances

Remixes
2004: "Biting Tongues" by Faultline
2004: "Where I Belong" by Sia
2004: "Take Your Mama" by Scissor Sisters
2004: "Ladyflash" by The Go! Team
2004: "Perspective" by Kevin Mark Trail
2004: "TKO" by Le Tigre
2004: "Like It or Leave It" by Chikinki
2005: "Bootprints" by King Creosote
2005: "Destroy Everything You Touch" by Ladytron
2005: "Do As You Please" by Diefenbach
2005: "Do the Whirlwind" by Architecture in Helsinki
2005: "U.R.A.Q.T." by M.I.A.
2005: "Easy/Lucky/Free" by Bright Eyes
2005: "Multiply" by Jamie Lidell
2005: "Passer By" by Mattafix
2005: "Roxxy" by Brooks
2005: "Voodoo" by Chungking
2006: "Kids with Guns" by Gorillaz
2006: "Kindling for the Master" by Stephen Malkmus
2006: "Launch Yourself" by Adem
2006: "Nothing's Gonna Change Your Mind" by Badly Drawn Boy
2006: "Rehab" by Amy Winehouse
2006: "Right Where You Are" by Amp Fiddler
2006: "Slowly" by Max Sedgley
2006: "Steppin Out" by Lo-Fi-Fnk
2006: "Tendency" by Battle
2006: "Tetanus Crisis" by Dondolo
2006: "Walking Machine" by Revl9n
2006: "My Patch" by Jim Noir
2006: "Who Needs Actions When You Got Words" by Plan B
2006: "Let's Make Love and Listen to Death from Above" by CSS
2006: "Enemies Like This" by Radio 4
2007: "In the Morning" by Junior Boys
2007: "Mouthwash" by Kate Nash
2007: "Gabriel Prokofiev's String Quartet No. 1: III" by The Elysian Quartet
2007: "Girls & Boys in Love" by The Rumble Strips
2007: "I'm Free" by The Rolling Stones
2007: "Aerodynamik/La Forme Remixes" by Kraftwerk
2007: "No Stoppin" by M.A.N.D.Y.
2007: "I'm Designer" by Queens of the Stone Age
2007: "Must Be the Moon" by !!!
2007: "No More Mornings" by Spring Tides
2007: "Robot Man" by The Aliens
2007: "Sing Songs Along" by Tilly and the Wall
2007: "Don & Sherri" by Matthew Dear
2007: "Woop Woop" by The Chap
2007: "She's the One" by Caribou
2007: "King's Cross" by Tracey Thorn
2007: "Breakin' Up" by Rilo Kiley
2007: "Oi New York This Is London" by David E. Sugar
2008: "Trick for Treat" by Neon Neon
2008: "Passin' Me By" by The Pharcyde
2008: "Drive Your Car" by Grovesnor
2008: "Morning Light" By Sian Alice Group
2008: "Sad Song" By Au Revoir Simone
2008: "Heartbeat" by Late of the Pier
2008: "Winter Home Disco" by The Pictish Trail
2008: "Midnight Request Line" by Skream
2008: "Let the Spirit" by Roots Manuva
2008: "TV Friend" by WhoMadeWho
2008: "Life on the Beach" by Envelopes
2008: "The Don" by Sisters Of Transistors
2008: "Bangono Tribe" by Bangono Tribe
2009: "Day Is Done" by Jesse Rose
2009: "House Jam" by Gang Gang Dance
2010: "City of Blinding Lights" by U2
2010: "Hot-n-Fun" by N.E.R.D.
2011: "Losing My Patience" by Shit Robot
2011: "Drugs" by Kool Keith
2012: "H2O" by Dominik Eulberg
2013: "Sunset People" by Donna Summer
2013: "My Number" by Foals
2013: "Big Love" by Matthew E. White
2014: "Satellite" by Nine Inch Nails
2015: "Queen of Peace" by Florence and the Machine
2015: "Tutti Frutti" by New Order
2017: "Chained To The Rhythm" by Katy Perry
2017: "From Disco to Disco" by Whirlpool Productions
2018: "My My My!" by Troye Sivan
2020: "Think About Things" by Daði Freyr
2020: "Sunset People" by Donna Summer
2020: "Enola Gay" by Orchestral Manoeuvres In The Dark
2020: "Dead Horse" by Hayley Williams
2020: "Glowing in the Dark" by Django Django
2021: "Disco Man" by Remi Wolf
2021: "GLY" by Catching Flies
2021: "I am not a woman, I'm a god" by Halsey

Music videos

Notes

References

External links
 
 
 
 

Discographies of British artists
Electronic music discographies